Maria Sergeyevna Orlova (born 14 April 1988) is a Russian skeleton racer who joined the national squad in 2008. Orlova's best Skeleton World Cup finish was 3rd place in one of the 2012–13 season's stages. She won the silver medal at the European Championships 2013. She competed at the 2014 Winter Olympics in Sochi but was disqualified on 22 November 2017.

References

External links
 
 
 

1988 births
Russian female skeleton racers
Living people
Skeleton racers at the 2014 Winter Olympics
Olympic skeleton racers of Russia
Sportspeople from Saint Petersburg
Russian sportspeople in doping cases
Doping cases in skeleton
20th-century Russian women
21st-century Russian women